This is a list of the bird species recorded in Vietnam. The avifauna of Vietnam include a total of 962 species, of which 18 are endemic, and 5 have been introduced.

This list's taxonomic treatment (designation and sequence of orders, families and species) and nomenclature (common and scientific names) follow the conventions of The Clements Checklist of Birds of the World, 2022 edition. The family accounts at the beginning of each heading reflect this taxonomy, as do the species counts found in each family account. Introduced and accidental species are included in the total counts for Vietnam.

The following tags have been used to highlight several categories. The commonly occurring native species do not fall into any of these categories.

(A) Accidental - a species that rarely or accidentally occurs in Vietnam
(E) Endemic - a species endemic to Vietnam
(I) Introduced - a species introduced to Vietnam as a consequence, direct or indirect, of human actions
(Ex) Extirpated - a species that no longer occurs in Vietnam although populations exist elsewhere

Ducks, geese, and waterfowl
Order: AnseriformesFamily: Anatidae

Anatidae includes the ducks and most duck-like waterfowl, such as geese and swans. These birds are adapted to an aquatic existence with webbed feet, flattened bills, and feathers that are excellent at shedding water due to an oily coating.

Lesser whistling-duck, Dendrocygna javanica
Bar-headed goose, Anser indicus (A)
Graylag goose, Anser anser
Knob-billed duck, Sarkidiornis melanotos
Ruddy shelduck, Tadorna ferruginea (A)
Common shelduck, Tadorna tadorna (A)
Cotton pygmy-goose, Nettapus coromandelianus
Mandarin duck, Aix galericulata
Garganey, Spatula querquedula
Northern shoveler, Spatula clypeata
Gadwall, Mareca strepera
Falcated duck, Mareca falcata (A)
Eurasian wigeon, Mareca penelope
Indian spot-billed duck, Anas poecilorhyncha
Eastern spot-billed duck, Anas zonorhyncha
Mallard, Anas platyrhynchos (A)
Northern pintail, Anas acuta
Green-winged teal, Anas crecca
White-winged duck, Asarcornis scutulata
Red-crested pochard, Netta rufina (A)
Common pochard, Aythya ferina
Ferruginous duck, Aythya nyroca
Baer's pochard, Aythya baeri
Tufted duck, Aythya fuligula 
Greater scaup, Aythya marila (A)
Red-breasted merganser, Mergus serrator (A)
Scaly-sided merganser, Mergus squamatus (A)

Pheasants, grouse, and allies
Order: GalliformesFamily: Phasianidae

The Phasianidae are a family of terrestrial birds which consists of quails, partridges, snowcocks, francolins, spurfowls, tragopans, monals, pheasants, peafowls and jungle fowls. In general, they are plump (although they vary in size) and have broad, relatively short wings.

Hill partridge, Arborophila torqueola
Rufous-throated partridge, Arborophila rufogularis
Bar-backed partridge, Arborophila brunneopectus
Orange-necked partridge, Arborophila davidi (E)
Scaly-breasted partridge, Tropicoperdix chloropus
Vietnam partridge, Tropicoperdix chloropus merlini (E)
Chestnut-necklaced partridge, Tropicoperdix charltonii
Chinese francolin, Francolinus pintadeanus
Japanese quail, Coturnix japonica
Rain quail, Coturnix coromandelica
Blue-breasted quail, Coturnix chinensis
Mountain bamboo-partridge, Bambusicola fytchii
Temminck's tragopan, Tragopan temminckii
Red junglefowl, Gallus gallus
Edwards's pheasant, Lophura edwardsi (E)
Silver pheasant, Lophura nycthemera
Siamese fireback, Lophura diardi
Ring-necked pheasant, Phasianus colchicus
Germain's peacock-pheasant, Polyplectron germaini (E)
Grey peacock-pheasant, Polyplectron bicalcaratum
Vietnamese crested argus, Rheinardia ocellata
Green peafowl, Pavo muticus

Grebes
Order: PodicipediformesFamily: Podicipedidae

Grebes are small to medium-large freshwater diving birds. They have lobed toes and are excellent swimmers and divers. However, they have their feet placed far back on the body, making them quite ungainly on land.

Little grebe, Tachybaptus ruficollis
Great crested grebe, Podiceps cristatus (A)
Eared grebe, Podiceps nigricollis (A)

Pigeons and doves
Order: ColumbiformesFamily: Columbidae

Pigeons and doves are stout-bodied birds with short necks and short slender bills with a fleshy cere.

Rock pigeon, Columba livia (I)
Ashy wood-pigeon, Columba pulchricollis (A)
Pale-capped pigeon, Columba punicea
Oriental turtle-dove, Streptopelia orientalis
Red collared-dove, Streptopelia tranquebarica
Spotted dove, Spilopelia chinensis
Barred cuckoo-dove, Macropygia unchall
Little cuckoo-dove, Macropygia ruficeps
Asian emerald dove, Chalcophaps indica
Zebra dove, Geopelia striata (A)
Nicobar pigeon, Caloenas nicobarica
Pink-necked green-pigeon, Treron vernans
Orange-breasted green-pigeon, Treron bicincta
Ashy-headed green-pigeon, Treron phyayrei
Thick-billed green-pigeon, Treron curvirostra
Yellow-footed green-pigeon, Treron phoenicoptera
Yellow-vented green-pigeon, Treron seimundi
Pin-tailed green-pigeon, Treron apicauda
Wedge-tailed green-pigeon, Treron sphenura
White-bellied green-pigeon, Treron sieboldii
Green imperial-pigeon, Ducula aenea
Mountain imperial-pigeon, Ducula badia
Pied imperial-pigeon, Ducula bicolor

Bustards
Order: OtidiformesFamily: Otididae

Bustards are large terrestrial birds mainly associated with dry open country and steppes in the Old World. They are omnivorous and nest on the ground. They walk steadily on strong legs and big toes, pecking for food as they go. They have long broad wings with "fingered" wingtips and striking patterns in flight. Many have interesting mating displays.

Bengal florican, Houbaropsis bengalensis

Cuckoos
Order: CuculiformesFamily: Cuculidae

The family Cuculidae includes cuckoos, roadrunners and anis. These birds are of variable size with slender bodies, long tails and strong legs. The Old World cuckoos are brood parasites.

Coral-billed ground-cuckoo, Carpococcyx renauldi
Greater coucal, Centropus sinensis
Lesser coucal, Centropus bengalensis
Black-bellied malkoha, Phaenicophaeus diardi
Green-billed malkoha, Phaenicophaeus tristis
Chestnut-winged cuckoo, Clamator coromandus
Pied cuckoo, Clamator jacobinus (A)
Asian koel, Eudynamys scolopacea
Asian emerald cuckoo, Chrysococcyx maculatus
Violet cuckoo, Chrysococcyx xanthorhynchus
Little bronze-cuckoo, Chrysococcyx minutillus
Banded bay cuckoo, Cacomantis sonneratii
Plaintive cuckoo, Cacomantis merulinus
Square-tailed drongo-cuckoo, Surniculus lugubris
Large hawk-cuckoo, Hierococcyx sparverioides
Northern hawk-cuckoo, Hierococcyx hyperythrus (A)
Hodgson's hawk-cuckoo, Hierococcyx nisicolor
Lesser cuckoo, Cuculus poliocephalus
Indian cuckoo, Cuculus micropterus
Himalayan cuckoo, Cuculus saturatus
Common cuckoo, Cuculus canorus
Oriental cuckoo, Cuculus optatus

Frogmouths
Order: CaprimulgiformesFamily: Podargidae

The frogmouths are a group of nocturnal birds related to the nightjars. They are named for their large flattened hooked bill and huge frog-like gape, which they use to take insects.

Hodgson's frogmouth, Batrachostomus hodgsoni
Blyth's frogmouth, Batrachostomus affinis

Nightjars and allies
Order: CaprimulgiformesFamily: Caprimulgidae

Nightjars are medium-sized nocturnal birds that usually nest on the ground. They have long wings, short legs and very short bills. Most have small feet, of little use for walking, and long pointed wings. Their soft plumage is camouflaged to resemble bark or leaves.

Great eared-nightjar, Eurostopodus macrotis
Gray nightjar, Caprimulgus jotaka
Large-tailed nightjar, Caprimulgus macrurus
Indian nightjar, Caprimulgus asiaticus
Savanna nightjar, Caprimulgus affinis

Swifts
Order: CaprimulgiformesFamily: Apodidae

Swifts are small birds which spend the majority of their lives flying. These birds have very short legs and never settle voluntarily on the ground, perching instead only on vertical surfaces. Many swifts have long swept-back wings which resemble a crescent or boomerang.

White-throated needletail, Hirundapus caudacutus
Silver-backed needletail, Hirundapus cochinchinensis
Brown-backed needletail, Hirundapus giganteus
Himalayan swiftlet, Aerodramus brevirostris
Black-nest swiftlet, Aerodramus maximus
White-nest swiftlet, Aerodramus fuciphagus
German's swiftlet, Aerodramus germani
Pacific swift, Apus pacificus
Cook's swift, Apus cooki
House swift, Apus nipalensis
Asian palm-swift, Cypsiurus balasiensis

Treeswifts
Order: CaprimulgiformesFamily: Hemiprocnidae

The treeswifts, also called crested swifts, are closely related to the true swifts. They differ from the other swifts in that they have crests, long forked tails and softer plumage.

Crested treeswift, Hemiprocne coronata

Rails, gallinules and coots
Order: GruiformesFamily: Rallidae

Rallidae is a large family of small to medium-sized birds which includes the rails, crakes, coots and gallinules. Typically they inhabit dense vegetation in damp environments near lakes, swamps or rivers. In general they are shy and secretive birds, making them difficult to observe. Most species have strong legs and long toes which are well adapted to soft uneven surfaces. They tend to have short, rounded wings and to be weak fliers.

Brown-cheeked rail, Rallus indicus
Corn crake, Crex crex (A)
Slaty-breasted rail, Lewinia striata
Eurasian moorhen, Gallinula chloropus
Eurasian coot, Fulica atra
Gray-headed swamphen, Porphyrio poliocephalus
Watercock, Gallicrex cinerea
White-breasted waterhen, Amaurornis phoenicurus
White-browed crake, Poliolimnas cinereus
Red-legged crake, Rallina fasciata
Slaty-legged crake, Rallina eurizonoides
Ruddy-breasted crake, Zapornia fusca
Band-bellied crake, Zapornia paykullii
Brown crake, Zapornia akool
Baillon's crake, Zapornia pusilla
Black-tailed crake, Zapornia bicolor

Finfoots
Order: GruiformesFamily: Heliornithidae

Heliornithidae is a small family of tropical birds with webbed lobes on their feet similar to those of grebes and coots.

Masked finfoot, Heliopais personata

Cranes
Order: GruiformesFamily: Gruidae

Cranes are large, long-legged and long-necked birds. Unlike the similar-looking but unrelated herons, cranes fly with necks outstretched, not pulled back. Most have elaborate and noisy courting displays or "dances".

Sarus crane, Antigone antigone
Common crane, Grus grus
Black-necked crane, Grus nigricollis

Thick-knees
Order: CharadriiformesFamily: Burhinidae

The thick-knees are a group of largely tropical waders in the family Burhinidae. They are found worldwide within the tropical zone, with some species also breeding in temperate Europe and Australia. They are medium to large waders with strong black or yellow-black bills, large yellow eyes and cryptic plumage. Despite being classed as waders, most species have a preference for arid or semi-arid habitats.

Indian thick-knee, Burhinus indicus
Great thick-knee, Esacus recurvirostris

Stilts and avocets
Order: CharadriiformesFamily: Recurvirostridae

Recurvirostridae is a family of large wading birds, which includes the avocets and stilts. The avocets have long legs and long up-curved bills. The stilts have extremely long legs and long, thin, straight bills.

Black-winged stilt, Himantopus himantopus
Pied avocet, Recurvirostra avosetta (A)

Oystercatchers
Order: CharadriiformesFamily: Haematopodidae

The oystercatchers are large and noisy plover-like birds, with strong bills used for smashing or prising open molluscs.

Eurasian oystercatcher, Haematopus ostralegus (A)

Plovers and lapwings
Order: CharadriiformesFamily: Charadriidae

The family Charadriidae includes the plovers, dotterels and lapwings. They are small to medium-sized birds with compact bodies, short, thick necks and long, usually pointed, wings. They are found in open country worldwide, mostly in habitats near water.

Black-bellied plover, Pluvialis squatarola
Pacific golden-plover, Pluvialis fulva
Northern lapwing, Vanellus vanellus
River lapwing, Vanellus duvaucelii
Gray-headed lapwing, Vanellus cinereus
Red-wattled lapwing, Vanellus indicus
Lesser sand-plover, Charadrius mongolus
Greater sand-plover, Charadrius leschenaultii
Malaysian plover, Charadrius peronii
Kentish plover, Charadrius alexandrinus
White-faced plover, Charadrius dealbatus
Common ringed plover, Charadrius hiaticula (A)
Long-billed plover, Charadrius placidus
Little ringed plover, Charadrius dubius
Oriental plover, Charadrius veredus

Painted-snipes
Order: CharadriiformesFamily: Rostratulidae

Painted-snipes are short-legged, long-billed birds similar in shape to the true snipes, but more brightly coloured.

Greater painted-snipe, Rostratula benghalensis

Jacanas
Order: CharadriiformesFamily: Jacanidae

The jacanas are a group of tropical waders in the family Jacanidae. They are found throughout the tropics. They are identifiable by their huge feet and claws which enable them to walk on floating vegetation in the shallow lakes that are their preferred habitat.

Pheasant-tailed jacana, Hydrophasianus chirurgus
Bronze-winged jacana, Metopidius indicus

Sandpipers and allies
Order: CharadriiformesFamily: Scolopacidae

Scolopacidae is a large diverse family of small to medium-sized shorebirds including the sandpipers, curlews, godwits, shanks, tattlers, woodcocks, snipes, dowitchers and phalaropes. The majority of these species eat small invertebrates picked out of the mud or soil. Variation in length of legs and bills enables multiple species to feed in the same habitat, particularly on the coast, without direct competition for food.

Whimbrel, Numenius phaeopus
Far Eastern curlew, Numenius madagascariensis
Eurasian curlew, Numenius arquata
Bar-tailed godwit, Limosa lapponica
Black-tailed godwit, Limosa limosa
Ruddy turnstone, Arenaria interpres
Great knot, Calidris tenuirostris
Red knot, Calidris canutus
Ruff, Calidris pugnax
Broad-billed sandpiper, Calidris falcinellus
Sharp-tailed sandpiper, Calidris acuminata (A)
Curlew sandpiper, Calidris ferruginea
Temminck's stint, Calidris temminckii
Long-toed stint, Calidris subminuta
Spoon-billed sandpiper, Calidris pygmea (A)
Red-necked stint, Calidris ruficollis
Sanderling, Calidris alba
Dunlin, Calidris alpina
Little stint, Calidris minuta (A)
Pectoral sandpiper, Calidris melanotos (A)
Asian dowitcher, Limnodromus semipalmatus
Long-billed dowitcher, Limnodromus scolopaceus (A)
Jack snipe, Lymnocryptes minimus
Eurasian woodcock, Scolopax rusticola
Solitary snipe, Gallinago solitaria (A)
Wood snipe, Gallinago nemoricola
Common snipe, Gallinago gallinago
Pin-tailed snipe, Gallinago stenura
Swinhoe's snipe, Gallinago megala
Terek sandpiper, Xenus cinereus
Red-necked phalarope, Phalaropus lobatus
Common sandpiper, Actitis hypoleucos
Green sandpiper, Tringa ochropus
Gray-tailed tattler, Tringa brevipes
Spotted redshank, Tringa erythropus
Common greenshank, Tringa nebularia
Nordmann's greenshank, Tringa guttifer
Marsh sandpiper, Tringa stagnatilis
Wood sandpiper, Tringa glareola
Common redshank, Tringa totanus

Buttonquail
Order: CharadriiformesFamily: Turnicidae

The buttonquail are small, drab, running birds which resemble the true quails. The female is the brighter of the sexes and initiates courtship. The male incubates the eggs and tends the young.

Small buttonquail, Turnix sylvatica
Yellow-legged buttonquail, Turnix tanki
Barred buttonquail, Turnix suscitator

Pratincoles and coursers
Order: CharadriiformesFamily: Glareolidae

Glareolidae is a family of wading birds comprising the pratincoles, which have short legs, long pointed wings and long forked tails, and the coursers, which have long legs, short wings and long, pointed bills which curve downwards.

Oriental pratincole, Glareola maldivarum
Small pratincole, Glareola lactea (A)

Skuas and jaegers
Order: CharadriiformesFamily: Stercorariidae

The family Stercorariidae are, in general, medium to large birds, typically with grey or brown plumage, often with white markings on the wings. They nest on the ground in temperate and arctic regions and are long-distance migrants.

Pomarine jaeger, Stercorarius pomarinus
Parasitic jaeger, Stercorarius parasiticus

Auks, murres, and puffins
Order: CharadriiformesFamily: Alcidae

Alcids are superficially similar to penguins due to their black-and-white colors, their upright posture and some of their habits, however they are not related to the penguins and differ in being able to fly. Auks live on the open sea, only deliberately coming ashore to nest.

Ancient murrelet, Synthliboramphus antiquus (A)

Gulls, terns, and skimmers
Order: CharadriiformesFamily: Laridae

Laridae is a family of medium to large seabirds, the gulls, terns, and skimmers. Gulls are typically grey or white, often with black markings on the head or wings. They have stout, longish bills and webbed feet. Terns are a group of generally medium to large seabirds typically with grey or white plumage, often with black markings on the head. Most terns hunt fish by diving but some pick insects off the surface of fresh water. Terns are generally long-lived birds, with several species known to live in excess of 30 years.

Saunders's gull, Saundersilarus saundersi
Black-headed gull, Chroicocephalus ridibundus
Brown-headed gull, Chroicocephalus brunnicephalus
Relict gull, Ichthyaetus relictus (A)
Pallas's gull, Ichthyaetus ichthyaetus
Black-tailed gull, Larus crassirostris
Common gull, Larus canus (A)
Herring gull, Larus argentatus
Caspian gull, Larus cachinnans
Lesser black-backed gull, Larus fuscus
Brown noddy, Anous stolidus (A)
White tern, Gygis alba
Sooty tern, Onychoprion fuscatus
Bridled tern, Onychoprion anaethetus
Little tern, Sternula albifrons
Gull-billed tern, Gelochelidon nilotica
Caspian tern, Hydroprogne caspia
White-winged tern, Chlidonias leucopterus
Whiskered tern, Chlidonias hybrida
Roseate tern, Sterna dougallii
Black-naped tern, Sterna sumatrana
Common tern, Sterna hirundo
Arctic tern, Sterna paradisaea (A)
Black-bellied tern, Sterna acuticauda (A)
River tern, Sterna aurantia
Great crested tern, Thalasseus bergii
Lesser crested tern, Thalasseus bengalensis (A)

Tropicbirds
Order: PhaethontiformesFamily: Phaethontidae

Tropicbirds are slender white birds of tropical oceans, with exceptionally long central tail feathers. Their heads and long wings have black markings.

Red-billed tropicbird, Phaethon aethereus

Northern storm-petrels
Order: ProcellariiformesFamily: Hydrobatidae

The northern storm-petrels are relatives of the petrels and are the smallest seabirds. They feed on planktonic crustaceans and small fish picked from the surface, typically while hovering. The flight is fluttering and sometimes bat-like.

Swinhoe's storm-petrel, Hydrobates monorhis

Shearwaters and petrels
Order: ProcellariiformesFamily: Procellariidae

The procellariids are the main group of medium-sized "true petrels", characterized by united nostrils with medium septum and a long outer functional primary.

Streaked shearwater, Calonectris leucomelas (A)
Wedge-tailed shearwater, Ardenna pacifica (A)
Christmas shearwater, Puffinus nativitatis (A)

Storks
Order: CiconiiformesFamily: Ciconiidae

Storks are large, long-legged, long-necked, wading birds with long, stout bills. Storks are mute, but bill-clattering is an important mode of communication at the nest. Their nests can be large and may be reused for many years. Many species are migratory.

Asian openbill, Anastomus oscitans
Black stork, Ciconia nigra
Asian woolly-necked stork, Ciconia episcopus
Black-necked stork, Ephippiorhynchus asiaticus
Lesser adjutant, Leptoptilos javanicus
Greater adjutant, Leptoptilos dubius
Milky stork, Mycteria cinerea
Painted stork, Mycteria leucocephala

Frigatebirds
Order: SuliformesFamily: Fregatidae

Frigatebirds are large seabirds usually found over tropical oceans. They are large, black-and-white or completely black, with long wings and deeply forked tails. The males have coloured inflatable throat pouches. They do not swim or walk and cannot take off from a flat surface. Having the largest wingspan-to-body-weight ratio of any bird, they are essentially aerial, able to stay aloft for more than a week.

Lesser frigatebird, Fregata ariel (A)
Christmas Island frigatebird, Fregata andrewsi (A)
Great frigatebird, Fregata minor (A)

Boobies and gannets
Order: SuliformesFamily: Sulidae

The sulids comprise the gannets and boobies. Both groups are medium to large coastal seabirds that plunge-dive for fish.

Masked booby, Sula dactylatra (A)
Brown booby, Sula leucogaster
Red-footed booby, Sula sula

Anhingas
Order: SuliformesFamily: Anhingidae

Anhingas or darters are often called "snake-birds" because of their long thin neck, which gives a snake-like appearance when they swim with their bodies submerged. The males have black and dark-brown plumage, an erectile crest on the nape and a larger bill than the female. The females have much paler plumage especially on the neck and underparts. The darters have completely webbed feet and their legs are short and set far back on the body. Their plumage is somewhat permeable, like that of cormorants, and they spread their wings to dry after diving.

Oriental darter, Anhinga melanogaster

Cormorants and shags
Order: SuliformesFamily: Phalacrocoracidae

Phalacrocoracidae is a family of medium to large coastal, fish-eating seabirds that includes cormorants and shags. Plumage colouration varies, with the majority having mainly dark plumage, some species being black-and-white and a few being colourful.

Little cormorant, Microcarbo niger
Great cormorant, Phalacrocorax carbo
Indian cormorant, Phalacrocorax fuscicollis

Pelicans
Order: PelecaniformesFamily: Pelecanidae

Pelicans are large water birds with a distinctive pouch under their beak. As with other members of the order Pelecaniformes, they have webbed feet with four toes.

Great white pelican, Pelecanus onocrotalus (A)
Spot-billed pelican, Pelecanus philippensis (A)

Herons, egrets, and bitterns
Order: PelecaniformesFamily: Ardeidae

The family Ardeidae contains the bitterns, herons and egrets. Herons and egrets are medium to large wading birds with long necks and legs. Bitterns tend to be shorter necked and more wary. Members of Ardeidae fly with their necks retracted, unlike other long-necked birds such as storks, ibises and spoonbills.

Great bittern, Botaurus stellaris
Yellow bittern, Ixobrychus sinensis
Schrenck's bittern, Ixobrychus eurhythmus
Cinnamon bittern, Ixobrychus cinnamomeus
Black bittern, Ixobrychus flavicollis
Gray heron, Ardea cinerea
Great-billed heron, Ardea sumatrana
Purple heron, Ardea purpurea
Great egret, Ardea alba
Intermediate egret, Ardea intermedia
Chinese egret, Egretta eulophotes
Little egret, Egretta garzetta
Pacific reef-heron, Egretta sacra
Cattle egret, Bubulcus ibis
Chinese pond-heron, Ardeola bacchus
Javan pond-heron, Ardeola speciosa
Striated heron, Butorides striata
Black-crowned night-heron, Nycticorax nycticorax
White-eared night-heron, Gorsachius magnificus
Malayan night-heron, Gorsachius melanolophus

Ibises and spoonbills
Order: PelecaniformesFamily: Threskiornithidae

Threskiornithidae is a family of large terrestrial and wading birds which includes the ibises and spoonbills. They have long, broad wings with 11 primary and about 20 secondary feathers. They are strong fliers and despite their size and weight, very capable soarers.

Glossy ibis, Plegadis falcinellus
Black-headed ibis, Threskiornis melanocephalus
White-shouldered ibis, Pseudibis davisoni (Ex)
Giant ibis, Pseudibis gigantea (A)
Eurasian spoonbill, Platalea leucorodia (A)
Black-faced spoonbill, Platalea minor

Osprey
Order: AccipitriformesFamily: Pandionidae

The family Pandionidae contains only one species, the osprey. The osprey is a medium-large raptor which is a specialist fish-eater with a worldwide distribution.

Osprey, Pandion haliaetus

Hawks, eagles, and kites
Order: AccipitriformesFamily: Accipitridae

Accipitridae is a family of birds of prey, which includes hawks, eagles, kites, harriers and Old World vultures. These birds have powerful hooked beaks for tearing flesh from their prey, strong legs, powerful talons and keen eyesight.

Black-winged kite, Elanus caeruleus
Oriental honey-buzzard, Pernis ptilorhynchus
Jerdon's baza, Aviceda jerdoni
Black baza, Aviceda leuphotes
Red-headed vulture, Sarcogyps calvus
Cinereous vulture, Aegypius monachus 
White-rumped vulture, Gyps bengalensis (Ex?)
Indian vulture, Gyps indicus
Crested serpent-eagle, Spilornis cheela
Short-toed snake-eagle, Circaetus gallicus
Changeable hawk-eagle, Nisaetus cirrhatus
Mountain hawk-eagle, Nisaetus nipalensis
Rufous-bellied eagle, Lophotriorchis kienerii
Black eagle, Ictinaetus malaiensis
Greater spotted eagle, Clanga clanga
Booted eagle, Hieraaetus pennatus (A)
Steppe eagle, Aquila nipalensis (A)
Imperial eagle, Aquila heliaca (A)
Bonelli's eagle, Aquila fasciata
Rufous-winged buzzard, Butastur liventer
Gray-faced buzzard, Butastur indicus
Eurasian marsh-harrier, Circus aeruginosus
Eastern marsh-harrier, Circus spilonotus
Hen harrier, Circus cyaneus (A)
Pallid harrier, Circus macrourus (A)
Pied harrier, Circus melanoleucos
Crested goshawk, Accipiter trivirgatus
Shikra, Accipiter badius
Chinese sparrowhawk, Accipiter soloensis
Japanese sparrowhawk, Accipiter gularis
Besra, Accipiter virgatus
Eurasian sparrowhawk, Accipiter nisus
Northern goshawk, Accipiter gentilis
Black kite, Milvus migrans
Brahminy kite, Haliastur indus
White-tailed eagle, Haliaeetus albicilla (A)
Pallas's fish-eagle, Haliaeetus leucoryphus (A)
White-bellied sea-eagle, Haliaeetus leucogaster
Lesser fish-eagle, Haliaeetus humilis
Gray-headed fish-eagle, Haliaeetus ichthyaetus
Common buzzard, Buteo buteo
Himalayan buzzard, Buteo refectus (A)
Eastern buzzard, Buteo japonicus

Barn-owls
Order: StrigiformesFamily: Tytonidae

Barn owls are medium to large owls with large heads and characteristic heart-shaped faces. They have long strong legs with powerful talons.

Australasian grass-owl, Tyto longimembris
Barn owl, Tyto alba
Oriental bay-owl, Phodilus badius

Owls
Order: StrigiformesFamily: Strigidae

The typical owls are small to large solitary nocturnal birds of prey. They have large forward-facing eyes and ears, a hawk-like beak and a conspicuous circle of feathers around each eye called a facial disk.

Mountain scops-owl, Otus spilocephalus
Collared scops-owl, Otus lettia
Sunda scops-owl, Otus lempiji
Oriental scops-owl, Otus sunia
Spot-bellied eagle-owl, Bubo nipalensis
Brown fish-owl, Ketupa zeylonensis
Tawny fish-owl, Ketupa flavipes
Buffy fish-owl, Ketupa ketupu
Collared owlet, Taenioptynx brodiei
Asian barred owlet, Glaucidium cuculoides
Spotted owlet, Athene brama
Spotted wood-owl, Strix seloputo
Brown wood-owl, Strix leptogrammica
Himalayan owl, Strix nivicolum
Long-eared owl, Asio otus (A)
Short-eared owl, Asio flammeus
Brown boobook, Ninox scutulata
Northern boobook, Ninox japonica (A)

Trogons
Order: TrogoniformesFamily: Trogonidae

The family Trogonidae includes trogons and quetzals. Found in tropical woodlands worldwide, they feed on insects and fruit, and their broad bills and weak legs reflect their diet and arboreal habits. Although their flight is fast, they are reluctant to fly any distance. Trogons have soft, often colourful, feathers with distinctive male and female plumage.

Red-headed trogon, Harpactes erythrocephalus
Orange-breasted trogon, Harpactes oreskios
Ward's trogon, Harpactes wardi

Hoopoes
Order: BucerotiformesFamily: Upupidae

Hoopoes have black, white and orangey-pink colouring with a large erectile crest on their head.

Eurasian hoopoe, Upupa epops

Hornbills
Order: BucerotiformesFamily: Bucerotidae

Hornbills are a group of birds whose bill is shaped like a cow's horn, but without a twist, sometimes with a casque on the upper mandible. Frequently, the bill is brightly coloured.

White-crowned hornbill, Berenicornis comatus
Great hornbill, Buceros bicornis
Brown hornbill, Anorrhinus austeni
Black hornbill, Anthracoceros malayanus
Oriental pied-hornbill, Anthracoceros albirostris
Rufous-necked hornbill, Aceros nipalensis
Wreathed hornbill, Rhyticeros undulatus

Kingfishers
Order: CoraciiformesFamily: Alcedinidae

Kingfishers are medium-sized birds with large heads, long, pointed bills, short legs and stubby tails.

Blyth's kingfisher, Alcedo hercules
Common kingfisher, Alcedo atthis
Blue-eared kingfisher, Alcedo meninting
Black-backed dwarf-kingfisher, Ceyx erithaca
Banded kingfisher, Lacedo pulchella
Stork-billed kingfisher, Pelargopsis capensis
Ruddy kingfisher, Halcyon coromanda
White-throated kingfisher, Halcyon smyrnensis
Black-capped kingfisher, Halcyon pileata
Collared kingfisher, Todirhamphus chloris
Crested kingfisher, Megaceryle lugubris
Pied kingfisher, Ceryle rudis

Bee-eaters
Order: CoraciiformesFamily: Meropidae

The bee-eaters are a group of near passerine birds in the family Meropidae. Most species are found in Africa but others occur in southern Europe, Madagascar, Australia and New Guinea. They are characterised by richly coloured plumage, slender bodies and usually elongated central tail feathers. All are colourful and have long downturned bills and pointed wings, which give them a swallow-like appearance when seen from afar.

Blue-bearded bee-eater, Nyctyornis athertoni
Asian green bee-eater, Merops orientalis
Blue-throated bee-eater, Merops viridis
Blue-tailed bee-eater, Merops philippinus
Chestnut-headed bee-eater, Merops leschenaultia

Rollers
Order: CoraciiformesFamily: Coraciidae

Rollers resemble crows in size and build, but are more closely related to the kingfishers and bee-eaters. They share the colourful appearance of those groups with blues and browns predominating. The two inner front toes are connected, but the outer toe is not.

Indochinese roller, Coracias affinis
Dollarbird, Eurystomus orientalis

Asian barbets
Order: PiciformesFamily: Megalaimidae

The Asian barbets are plump birds, with short necks and large heads. They get their name from the bristles which fringe their heavy bills. Most species are brightly coloured.

Coppersmith barbet, Psilopogon haemacephalus
Blue-eared barbet, Psilopogon duvaucelii
Great barbet, Psilopogon virens
Red-vented barbet, Psilopogon lagrandieri
Green-eared barbet, Psilopogon faiostrictus
Lineated barbet, Psilopogon lineatus
Golden-throated barbet, Psilopogon franklinii
Necklaced barbet, Psilopogon auricularis
Moustached barbet, Psilopogon incognitus
Blue-throated barbet, Psilopogon asiaticus
Indochinese barbet, Psilopogon annamensis

Woodpeckers
Order: PiciformesFamily: Picidae

Woodpeckers are small to medium-sized birds with chisel-like beaks, short legs, stiff tails and long tongues used for capturing insects. Some species have feet with two toes pointing forward and two backward, while several species have only three toes. Many woodpeckers have the habit of tapping noisily on tree trunks with their beaks.

Eurasian wryneck, Jynx torquilla
Speckled piculet, Picumnus innominatus
White-browed piculet, Sasia ochracea
Heart-spotted woodpecker, Hemicircus canente
Gray-capped pygmy woodpecker, Yungipicus canicapillus
Yellow-crowned woodpecker, Leiopicus mahrattensis
Rufous-bellied woodpecker, Dendrocopos hyperythrus
Freckle-breasted woodpecker, Dendrocopos analis
Stripe-breasted woodpecker, Dendrocopos atratus
Darjeeling woodpecker, Dendrocopos darjellensis
Great spotted woodpecker, Dendrocopos major
Crimson-breasted woodpecker, Dryobates cathpharius
Bay woodpecker, Blythipicus pyrrhotis
Greater flameback, Chrysocolaptes guttacristatus
Rufous woodpecker, Micropternus brachyurus
Black-and-buff woodpecker, Meiglyptes jugularis
Pale-headed woodpecker, Gecinulus grantia
Common flameback, Dinopium javanense
Lesser yellownape, Picus chlorolophus
Streak-throated woodpecker, Picus xanthopygaeus
Red-collared woodpecker, Picus rabieri
Laced woodpecker, Picus vittatus
Gray-headed woodpecker, Picus canus
Black-headed woodpecker, Picus erythropygius
Greater yellownape, Chrysophlegma flavinucha
Great slaty woodpecker, Mulleripicus pulverulentus
White-bellied woodpecker, Dryocopus javensis

Falcons
Order: FalconiformesFamily: Falconidae

Falconidae is a family of diurnal birds of prey. They differ from hawks, eagles and kites in that they kill with their beaks instead of their talons.

White-rumped falcon, Polihierax insignis
Collared falconet, Microhierax caerulescens
Pied falconet, Microhierax melanoleucus
Eurasian kestrel, Falco tinnunculus
Amur falcon, Falco amurensis
Merlin, Falco columbarius (A)
Eurasian hobby, Falco subbuteo
Oriental hobby, Falco severus
Laggar falcon, Falco jugger
Peregrine falcon, Falco peregrinus

Old World parrots
Order: PsittaciformesFamily: Psittaculidae

Parrots are small to large birds with a characteristic curved beak. Their upper mandibles have slight mobility in the joint with the skull and they have a generally erect stance. All parrots are zygodactyl, having the four toes on each foot placed two at the front and two to the back.

Blue-rumped parrot, Psittinus cyanurus
Alexandrine parakeet, Psittacula eupatria
Rose-ringed parakeet, Psittacula krameri (I)
Gray-headed parakeet, Psittacula finschii
Blossom-headed parakeet, Psittacula roseata
Red-breasted parakeet, Psittacula alexandri
Long-tailed parakeet, Psittacula longicauda
Vernal hanging-parrot, Loriculus vernalis

Asian and Grauer’s broadbills
Order: PasseriformesFamily: Eurylaimidae

The broadbills are small, brightly coloured birds, which feed on fruit and also take insects in flycatcher fashion, snapping their broad bills. Their habitat is canopies of wet forests.

Black-and-red broadbill, Cymbirhynchus macrorhynchos
Long-tailed broadbill, Psarisomus dalhousiae
Silver-breasted broadbill, Serilophus lunatus
Banded broadbill, Eurylaimus javanicus
Dusky broadbill, Corydon sumatranus

Pittas
Order: PasseriformesFamily: Pittidae

Pittas are medium-sized by passerine standards and are stocky, with fairly long, strong legs, short tails and stout bills. Many are brightly coloured. They spend the majority of their time on wet forest floors, eating snails, insects and similar invertebrates.

Eared pitta, Hydrornis phayrei
Rusty-naped pitta, Hydrornis oatesi
Blue-naped pitta, Hydrornis nipalensis
Blue-rumped pitta, Hydrornis soror
Blue pitta, Hydrornis cyanea
Bar-bellied pitta, Hydrornis elliotii
Blue-winged pitta, Pitta moluccensis
Fairy pitta, Pitta nympha
Hooded pitta, Pitta sordida

Thornbills and allies
Order: PasseriformesFamily: Acanthizidae

Thornbills are small passerine birds, similar in habits to the tits.

Golden-bellied gerygone, Gerygone sulphurea

Cuckooshrikes
Order: PasseriformesFamily: Campephagidae

The cuckooshrikes are small to medium-sized passerine birds. They are predominantly greyish with white and black, although some species are brightly coloured.

Small minivet, Pericrocotus cinnamomeus
Gray-chinned minivet, Pericrocotus solaris
Short-billed minivet, Pericrocotus brevirostris
Long-tailed minivet, Pericrocotus ethologus
Scarlet minivet, Pericrocotus flammeus
Ashy minivet, Pericrocotus divaricatus
Brown-rumped minivet, Pericrocotus cantonensis
Rosy minivet, Pericrocotus roseus
Large cuckooshrike, Coracina macei
Black-winged cuckooshrike, Lalage melaschistos
Indochinese cuckooshrike, Lalage polioptera

Vireos, shrike-babblers, and erpornis
Order: PasseriformesFamily: Vireonidae

Most of the members of this family are found in the New World. However, the shrike-babblers and erpornis, which only slightly resemble the "true" vireos and greenlets, are found in South East Asia.

Black-headed shrike-babbler, Pteruthius rufiventer
White-browed shrike-babbler, Pteruthius aeralatus
Green shrike-babbler, Pteruthius xanthochlorus (A) 
Black-eared shrike-babbler, Pteruthius melanotis
Clicking shrike-babbler, Pteruthius intermedius
White-bellied erpornis, Erpornis zantholeuca

Whistlers
Order: PasseriformesFamily: Pachycephalidae

The family Pachycephalidae includes the whistlers, shrikethrushes, shrikethrushes, and some of the pitohuis.

Mangrove whistler, Pachycephala cinerea

Old World orioles
Order: PasseriformesFamily: Oriolidae

The Old World orioles are colourful passerine birds. They are not related to the New World orioles.

Black-naped oriole, Oriolus chinensis
Slender-billed oriole, Oriolus tenuirostris
Black-hooded oriole, Oriolus xanthornus
Maroon oriole, Oriolus traillii
Silver oriole, Oriolus mellianus (A)

Woodswallows
Order: PasseriformesFamily: Artamidae

The woodswallows are soft-plumaged, somber-coloured passerine birds. They are smooth, agile flyers with moderately large, semi-triangular wings.

Ashy woodswallow, Artamus fuscus

Vangas, helmetshrikes, and allies
Order: PasseriformesFamily: Vangidae

The family Vangidae is highly variable, though most members of it resemble true shrikes to some degree.

Large woodshrike, Tephrodornis gularis
Common woodshrike, Tephrodornis pondicerianus
Bar-winged flycatcher-shrike, Hemipus picatus

Ioras
Order: PasseriformesFamily: Aegithinidae

The ioras are bulbul-like birds of open forest or thorn scrub, but whereas that group tends to be drab in colouration, ioras are sexually dimorphic, with the males being brightly plumaged in yellows and greens.

Common iora, Aegithina tiphia
Great iora, Aegithina lafresnayei

Fantails
Order: PasseriformesFamily: Rhipiduridae

The fantails are small insectivorous birds which are specialist aerial feeders.

Malaysian pied-fantail, Rhipidura javanica
White-throated fantail, Rhipidura albicollis
White-browed fantail, Rhipidura aureola

Drongos
Order: PasseriformesFamily: Dicruridae

The drongos are mostly black or dark grey in colour, sometimes with metallic tints. They have long forked tails, and some Asian species have elaborate tail decorations. They have short legs and sit very upright when perched, like a shrike. They flycatch or take prey from the ground.

Black drongo, Dicrurus macrocercus
Ashy drongo, Dicrurus leucophaeus
Crow-billed drongo, Dicrurus annectens
Bronzed drongo, Dicrurus aeneus
Lesser racket-tailed drongo, Dicrurus remifer
Hair-crested drongo, Dicrurus hottentottus
Greater racket-tailed drongo, Dicrurus paradiseus

Monarch flycatchers
Order: PasseriformesFamily: Monarchidae

The monarch flycatchers are small to medium-sized insectivorous passerines which hunt by flycatching.

Black-naped monarch, Hypothymis azurea
Japanese paradise-flycatcher, Terpsiphone atrocaudata
Amur paradise-flycatcher, Terpsiphone incei
Blyth's paradise-flycatcher, Terpsiphone affinis

Shrikes
Order: PasseriformesFamily: Laniidae

Shrikes are passerine birds known for their habit of catching other birds and small animals and impaling the uneaten portions of their bodies on thorns. A typical shrike's beak is hooked, like a bird of prey.

Tiger shrike, Lanius tigrinus
Bull-headed shrike, Lanius bucephalus (A)
Brown shrike, Lanius cristatus
Burmese shrike, Lanius collurioides
Long-tailed shrike, Lanius schach
Gray-backed shrike, Lanius tephronotus

Crows, jays, and magpies
Order: PasseriformesFamily: Corvidae

The family Corvidae includes crows, ravens, jays, choughs, magpies, treepies, nutcrackers and ground jays. Corvids are above average in size among the Passeriformes, and some of the larger species show high levels of intelligence.

Eurasian jay, Garrulus glandarius
Yellow-billed blue-magpie, Urocissa flavirostris
Red-billed blue-magpie, Urocissa erythrorhyncha
White-winged magpie, Urocissa whiteheadi
Common green-magpie, Cissa chinensis
Indochinese green-magpie, Cissa hypoleuca
Rufous treepie, Dendrocitta vagabunda
Gray treepie, Dendrocitta formosae
Collared treepie, Dendrocitta frontalis
Racket-tailed treepie, Crypsirina temia
Ratchet-tailed treepie, Temnurus temnurus
Oriental magpie, Pica serica
Eurasian magpie, Pica pica
Eurasian nutcracker, Nucifraga caryocatactes
House crow, Corvus splendens (I)
Carrion crow, Corvus corone (A)
Large-billed crow, Corvus macrorhynchos
Collared crow, Corvus torquatus

Fairy flycatchers
Order: PasseriformesFamily: Stenostiridae

Most of the species of this small family are found in Africa, though a few inhabit tropical Asia. They are not closely related to other birds called "flycatchers".

Yellow-bellied fairy-fantail, Chelidorhynx hypoxanthus
Gray-headed canary-flycatcher, Culicicapa ceylonensis

Tits, chickadees, and titmice
Order: PasseriformesFamily: Paridae

The Paridae are mainly small stocky woodland species with short stout bills. Some have crests. They are adaptable birds, with a mixed diet including seeds and insects.

Yellow-browed tit, Sylviparus modestus
Sultan tit, Melanochlora sultanea
Green-backed tit, Parus monticolus
Cinereous tit, Parus cinereus
Japanese tit, Parus minor
Yellow-cheeked tit, Machlolophus spilonotus

Penduline-tits
Order: PasseriformesFamily: Remizidae

The penduline-tits are a group of small passerine birds related to the true tits. They are insectivores.

Chinese penduline-tit, Remiz consobrinus (A)

Larks
Order: PasseriformesFamily: Alaudidae

Larks are small terrestrial birds with often extravagant songs and display flights. Most larks are fairly dull in appearance. Their food is insects and seeds.

Horsfield’s bushlark, Mirafra javanica
Indochinese bushlark, Mirafra erythrocephala
Asian short-toed lark, Alaudala cheleensis (A)
Oriental skylark, Alauda gulgula

Cisticolas and allies
Order: PasseriformesFamily: Cisticolidae

The Cisticolidae are warblers found mainly in warmer southern regions of the Old World. They are generally very small birds of drab brown or grey appearance found in open country such as grassland or scrub.

Common tailorbird, Orthotomus sutorius
Dark-necked tailorbird, Orthotomus atrogularis
Ashy tailorbird, Orthotomus ruficeps
Annam prinia, Prinia rocki (E)
Brown prinia, Prinia polychroa
Hill prinia, Prinia superciliaris
Rufescent prinia, Prinia rufescens
Gray-breasted prinia, Prinia hodgsonii
Yellow-bellied prinia, Prinia flaviventris
Plain prinia, Prinia inornata
Zitting cisticola, Cisticola juncidis
Golden-headed cisticola, Cisticola exilis

Reed warblers and allies
Order: PasseriformesFamily: Acrocephalidae

The members of this family are usually rather large for "warblers". Most are rather plain olivaceous brown above with much yellow to beige below. They are usually found in open woodland, reedbeds, or tall grass. The family occurs mostly in southern to western Eurasia and surroundings, but it also ranges far into the Pacific, with some species in Africa.
 
Thick-billed warbler, Arundinax aedon
Black-browed reed warbler, Acrocephalus bistrigiceps
Paddyfield warbler, Acrocephalus agricola (A)
Blunt-winged warbler, Acrocephalus concinens
Manchurian reed warbler, Acrocephalus tangorum
Oriental reed warbler, Acrocephalus orientalis
Clamorous reed warbler, Acrocephalus stentoreus

Grassbirds and allies
Order: PasseriformesFamily: Locustellidae

Locustellidae are a family of small insectivorous songbirds found mainly in Eurasia, Africa, and the Australian region. They are smallish birds with tails that are usually long and pointed, and tend to be drab brownish or buffy all over.

Striated grassbird, Megalurus palustris
Pallas's grasshopper warbler, Helopsaltes certhiola
Pleske's grasshopper warbler, Helopsaltes pleskei
Lanceolated warbler, Locustella lanceolata
Brown bush warbler, Locustella luteoventris
Chinese bush warbler, Locustella tacsanowskia
Baikal bush warbler, Locustella davidi
Russet bush warbler, Locustella mendelli
Dalat bush warbler, Locustella idonea (E)

Cupwings
Order: PasseriformesFamily: Pnoepygidae

The members of this small family are found in mountainous parts of South and South East Asia.

Scaly-breasted cupwing, Pnoepyga albiventer
Pygmy cupwing, Pnoepyga pusilla

Swallows
Order: PasseriformesFamily: Hirundinidae

The family Hirundinidae is adapted to aerial feeding. They have a slender streamlined body, long pointed wings and a short bill with a wide gape. The feet are adapted to perching rather than walking, and the front toes are partially joined at the base.

Gray-throated martin, Riparia chinensis
Bank swallow, Riparia riparia
Dusky crag-martin, Ptyonoprogne concolor
Barn swallow, Hirundo rustica
Wire-tailed swallow, Hirundo smithii
Pacific swallow, Hirundo tahiticaRed-rumped swallow, Cecropis daurica
Striated swallow, Cecropis striolata
Rufous-bellied swallow, Cecropis badia
Common house-martin, Delichon urbicum
Asian house-martin, Delichon dasypus
Nepal house-martin, Delichon nipalense

BulbulsOrder: PasseriformesFamily: Pycnonotidae

Bulbuls are medium-sized songbirds. Some are colourful with yellow, red or orange vents, cheeks, throats or supercilia, but most are drab, with uniform olive-brown to black plumage. Some species have distinct crests.

Black-headed bulbul, Brachypodius melanocephalos
Black-crested bulbul, Rubigula flaviventris
Crested finchbill, Spizixos canifrons
Collared finchbill, Spizixos semitorques
Striated bulbul, Pycnonotus striatus
Red-whiskered bulbul, Pycnonotus jocosus
Brown-breasted bulbul, Pycnonotus xanthorrhous
Light-vented bulbul, Pycnonotus sinensis
Sooty-headed bulbul, Pycnonotus aurigaster
Stripe-throated bulbul, Pycnonotus finlaysoni
Flavescent bulbul, Pycnonotus flavescens
Yellow-vented bulbul, Pycnonotus goiavier
Streak-eared bulbul, Pycnonotus conradi
Puff-throated bulbul, Alophoixus pallidus
Ochraceous bulbul, Alophoixus ochraceus
Gray-eyed bulbul, Iole propinqua
Black bulbul, Hypsipetes leucocephalus
Ashy bulbul, Hemixos flavala
Chestnut bulbul, Hemixos castanonotus
Mountain bulbul, Ixos mcclellandii
Streaked bulbul, Ixos malaccensis

Leaf warblersOrder: PasseriformesFamily: Phylloscopidae

Leaf warblers are a family of small insectivorous birds found mostly in Eurasia and ranging into Wallacea and Africa. The species are of various sizes, often green-plumaged above and yellow below, or more subdued with greyish-green to greyish-brown colours.

Ashy-throated warbler, Phylloscopus maculipennis
Buff-barred warbler, Phylloscopus pulcher
Yellow-browed warbler, Phylloscopus inornatus
Hume's warbler, Phylloscopus humei
Chinese leaf warbler, Phylloscopus yunnanensis
Pallas's leaf warbler, Phylloscopus proregulus
Gansu leaf warbler, Phylloscopus kansuensis (A)
Sichuan leaf warbler, Phylloscopus forresti
Radde's warbler, Phylloscopus schwarzi
Yellow-streaked warbler, Phylloscopus armandii
Dusky warbler, Phylloscopus fuscatus
Buff-throated warbler, Phylloscopus subaffinis
Common chiffchaff, Phylloscopus collybita (A)
Eastern crowned warbler, Phylloscopus coronatus
White-spectacled warbler, Phylloscopus affinis
Gray-cheeked warbler, Phylloscopus poliogenys
Gray-crowned warbler, Phylloscopus tephrocephalus
Bianchi's warbler, Phylloscopus valentini
Martens's warbler, Phylloscopus omeiensis
Alström's warbler, Phylloscopus soror
Greenish warbler, Phylloscopus trochiloides
Two-barred warbler, Phylloscopus plumbeitarsus
Pale-legged leaf warbler, Phylloscopus tenellipes
Sakhalin leaf warbler, Phylloscopus borealoides
Arctic warbler, Phylloscopus borealis
Chestnut-crowned warbler, Phylloscopus castaniceps
Limestone leaf warbler, Phylloscopus calciatilis
Yellow-vented warbler, Phylloscopus cantator
Sulphur-breasted warbler, Phylloscopus ricketti
Blyth's leaf warbler, Phylloscopus reguloides
Claudia's leaf warbler, Phylloscopus claudiae
Hartert's leaf warbler, Phylloscopus goodsoni
Davison's leaf warbler, Phylloscopus intensior
Kloss's leaf warbler, Phylloscopus ogilviegranti

Bush warblers and alliesOrder: PasseriformesFamily: Scotocercidae

The members of this family are found throughout Africa, Asia, and Polynesia. Their taxonomy is in flux, and some authorities place some genera in other families.

Pale-footed bush warbler, Urosphena pallidipes
Asian stubtail, Urosphena squameiceps
Gray-bellied tesia, Tesia cyaniventer
Slaty-bellied tesia, Tesia olivea
Chestnut-crowned bush warbler, Cettia major (A)
Chestnut-headed tesia, Cettia castaneocoronata
Yellow-bellied warbler, Abroscopus superciliaris
Rufous-faced warbler, Abroscopus albogularis
Black-faced warbler, Abroscopus schisticeps
Mountain tailorbird, Phyllergates cuculatus
Broad-billed warbler, Tickellia hodgsoni
Manchurian bush warbler, Horornis borealis
Brownish-flanked bush warbler, Horornis fortipes
Aberrant bush warbler, Horornis flavolivaceus

Long-tailed titsOrder: PasseriformesFamily: Aegithalidae

Long-tailed tits are a group of small passerine birds with medium to long tails. They make woven bag nests in trees. Most eat a mixed diet which includes insects.

Black-throated tit, Aegithalos concinnus

Sylviid warblers, parrotbills, and alliesOrder: PasseriformesFamily: Sylviidae

The family Sylviidae is a group of small insectivorous passerine birds. They mainly occur as breeding species, as the common name implies, in Europe, Asia and, to a lesser extent, Africa. Most are of generally undistinguished appearance, but many have distinctive songs.

Golden-breasted fulvetta, Lioparus chrysotis
Yellow-eyed babbler, Chrysomma sinense
Spectacled fulvetta, Fulvetta ruficapilla
Indochinese fulvetta, Fulvetta danisi
White-browed fulvetta, Fulvetta vinipectus
Streak-throated fulvetta, Fulvetta manipurensis
Gray-headed parrotbill, Psittiparus gularis
Black-headed parrotbill, Psittiparus margaritae (E)
Rufous-headed parrotbill, Psittiparus bakeri
Spot-breasted parrotbill, Paradoxornis guttaticollis
Pale-billed parrotbill, Chleuasicus atrosuperciliaris
Vinous-throated parrotbill, Sinosuthora webbiana
Ashy-throated parrotbill, Sinosuthora alphonsiana
Black-throated parrotbill, Suthora nipalensis
Golden parrotbill, Suthora verreauxi
Short-tailed parrotbill, Neosuthora davidiana

White-eyes, yuhinas, and alliesOrder: PasseriformesFamily: Zosteropidae

The white-eyes are small and mostly undistinguished, their plumage above being generally some dull colour like greenish-olive, but some species have a white or bright yellow throat, breast or lower parts, and several have buff flanks. As their name suggests, many species have a white ring around each eye.

White-collared yuhina, Parayuhina diademata
Indochinese yuhina, Staphida torqueola
Whiskered yuhina, Yuhina flavicollis
Stripe-throated yuhina, Yuhina gularis
Black-chinned yuhina, Yuhina nigrimenta
Chestnut-flanked white-eye, Zosterops erythropleurus
Indian white-eye, Zosterops palpebrosus
Swinhoe's white-eye, Zosterops simplex

Tree-babblers, scimitar-babblers, and alliesOrder: PasseriformesFamily: Timaliidae

The babblers, or timaliids, are somewhat diverse in size and colouration, but are characterised by soft fluffy plumage.

Chestnut-capped babbler, Timalia pileata
Pin-striped tit-babbler, Mixornis gularis
Gray-faced tit-babbler, Mixornis kelleyi
Golden babbler, Cyanoderma chrysaeum
Rufous-capped babbler, Cyanoderma ruficeps
Buff-chested babbler, Cyanoderma ambiguum
Bar-winged wren-babbler, Spelaeornis troglodytoides (A)
Pale-throated wren-babbler, Spelaeornis kinneari
Red-billed scimitar-babbler, Pomatorhinus ochraceiceps
Coral-billed scimitar-babbler, Pomatorhinus ferruginosus
Slender-billed scimitar-babbler, Pomatorhinus superciliaris
Streak-breasted scimitar-babbler, Pomatorhinus ruficollis
White-browed scimitar-babbler, Pomatorhinus schisticeps
Large scimitar-babbler, Erythrogenys hypoleucos
Rusty-cheeked scimitar-babbler, Erythrogenys erythrogenys
Black-streaked scimitar-babbler, Erythrogenys gravivox
Gray-throated babbler, Stachyris nigriceps
Spot-necked babbler, Stachyris striolata
Sooty babbler, Stachyris herberti
Nonggang babbler, Stachyris nonggangensis (A)

Ground babblers and alliesOrder: PasseriformesFamily: Pellorneidae

These small to medium-sized songbirds have soft fluffy plumage but are otherwise rather diverse. Members of the genus Illadopsis are found in forests, but some other genera are birds of scrublands.

Scaly-crowned babbler, Malacopteron cinereum
Collared babbler, Gampsorhynchus torquatus
Yellow-throated fulvetta, Schoeniparus cinereus
Rufous-winged fulvetta, Schoeniparus castaneceps
Black-crowned fulvetta, Schoeniparus klossi (E)
Rufous-throated fulvetta, Schoeniparus rufogularis
Dusky fulvetta, Schoeniparus brunneus
Rusty-capped fulvetta, Schoeniparus dubius
Puff-throated babbler, Pellorneum ruficeps
Spot-throated babbler, Pellorneum albiventre
Buff-breasted babbler, Pellorneum tickelli
Eyebrowed wren-babbler, Napothera epilepidota
Short-tailed scimitar-babbler, Napothera danjoui
White-throated wren-babbler, Napothera pasquieri (E)
Abbott's babbler, Malacocincla abbotti
Annam limestone babbler, Gypsophila annamensis
Streaked wren-babbler, Gypsophila brevicaudatus
Chinese grassbird, Graminicola striatus

Laughingthrushes and alliesOrder: PasseriformesFamily: Leiothrichidae

The members of this family are diverse in size and colouration, though those of genus Turdoides tend to be brown or greyish. The family is found in Africa, India, and southeast Asia.

Brown-cheeked fulvetta, Alcippe poioicephala
David's fulvetta, Alcippe davidi
Mountain fulvetta, Alcippe peracensis
Black-browed fulvetta, Alcippe grotei
Himalayan cutia, Cutia nipalensis
Vietnamese cutia, Cutia legalleni (E)
Masked laughingthrush, Garrulax perspicillatus
White-crested laughingthrush, Garrulax leucolophus
Lesser necklaced laughingthrush, Garrulax monileger
Black-hooded laughingthrush, Garrulax milleti (E)
Gray laughingthrush, Garrulax maesi
Rufous-cheeked laughingthrush, Garrulax castanotis
Spot-breasted laughingthrush, Garrulax merulinus
Orange-breasted laughingthrush, Garrulax annamensis (E)
Chinese hwamei, Garrulax canorus
Moustached laughingthrush, Ianthocincla cineracea (A) 
Rufous-chinned laughingthrush, Ianthocincla rufogularis
Chestnut-eared laughingthrush, Ianthocincla konkakinhensis (E)
Greater necklaced laughingthrush, Pterorhinus pectoralis
White-throated laughingthrush, Pterorhinus albogularis
Black-throated laughingthrush, Pterorhinus chinensis
White-cheeked laughingthrush, Pterorhinus vassali
Rufous-vented laughingthrush, Pterorhinus gularis
White-browed laughingthrush, Pterorhinus sannio
Scaly laughingthrush, Trochalopteron subunicolor
Blue-winged laughingthrush, Trochalopteron squamatum
Black-faced laughingthrush, Trochalopteron affine
Silver-eared laughingthrush, Trochalopteron melanostigma
Golden-winged laughingthrush, Trochalopteron ngoclinhense (E)
Collared laughingthrush, Trochalopteron yersini (E)
Red-winged laughingthrush, Trochalopteron formosum
Red-tailed laughingthrush, Trochalopteron milnei
Black-headed sibia, Heterophasia desgodinsi
Long-tailed sibia, Heterophasia picaoides
Silver-eared mesia, Leiothrix argentauris
Red-billed leiothrix, Leiothrix lutea
Red-tailed minla, Minla ignotincta
Rufous-backed sibia, Leioptila annectens
Gray-crowned crocias, Laniellus langbianis (E)
Scarlet-faced liocichla, Liocichla ripponi 
Black-crowned barwing, Actinodura sodangorum (E)
Streaked barwing, Actinodura souliei
Spectacled barwing, Actinodura ramsayi
Blue-winged minla, Actinodura cyanouroptera
Chestnut-tailed minla, Actinodura strigula

WallcreeperOrder: PasseriformesFamily: Tichodromidae

The wallcreeper is the only member of its family. It inhabits the high mountains of Eurasia from southern Europe to central China.

Wallcreeper, Tichodroma muraria (A)

NuthatchesOrder: PasseriformesFamily: Sittidae

Nuthatches are small woodland birds. They have the unusual ability to climb down trees head first, unlike other birds which can only go upwards. Nuthatches have big heads, short tails and powerful bills and feet.

Chestnut-bellied nuthatch, Sitta castanea
Burmese nuthatch, Sitta neglecta
Chestnut-vented nuthatch, Sitta nagaensis
White-tailed nuthatch, Sitta himalayensis
Velvet-fronted nuthatch, Sitta frontalis
Yellow-billed nuthatch, Sitta solangiae
Beautiful nuthatch, Sitta formosa

TreecreepersOrder: PasseriformesFamily: Certhiidae

Treecreepers are small woodland birds, brown above and white below. They have thin pointed down-curved bills, which they use to extricate insects from bark. They have stiff tail feathers, like woodpeckers, which they use to support themselves on vertical trees.

Hume's treecreeper, Certhia manipurensis

Spotted elachuraOrder: PasseriformesFamily: Elachuridae

This species, the only one in its family, inhabits forest undergrowth throughout South East Asia.

Spotted elachura, Elachura formosa

DippersOrder: PasseriformesFamily: Cinclidae

Dippers are a group of perching birds whose habitat includes aquatic environments in the Americas, Europe and Asia. They are named for their bobbing or dipping movements.

Brown dipper, Cinclus pallasii

StarlingsOrder: PasseriformesFamily: Sturnidae

Starlings are small to medium-sized passerine birds. Their flight is strong and direct and they are very gregarious. Their preferred habitat is fairly open country. They eat insects and fruit. Plumage is typically dark with a metallic sheen.

Asian glossy starling, Aplonis panayensis (A)
Golden-crested myna, Ampeliceps coronatus
Common hill myna, Gracula religiosa
European starling, Sturnus vulgaris (A)
Rosy starling, Pastor roseus (A)
Daurian starling, Agropsar sturninus
Chestnut-cheeked starling, Agropsar philippensis (A)
Black-collared starling, Gracupica nigricollis
Siamese pied starling, Gracupica floweri (A)
White-shouldered starling, Sturnia sinensis
Chestnut-tailed starling, Sturnia malabarica
Red-billed starling, Spodiopsar sericeus
White-cheeked starling, Spodiopsar cineraceus
Common myna, Acridotheres tristis
Vinous-breasted myna, Acridotheres leucocephalus
Great myna, Acridotheres grandis
Crested myna, Acridotheres cristatellus

Thrushes and alliesOrder: PasseriformesFamily: Turdidae

The thrushes are a group of passerine birds that occur mainly in the Old World. They are plump, soft plumaged, small to medium-sized insectivores or sometimes omnivores, often feeding on the ground. Many have attractive songs.

Long-tailed thrush, Zoothera dixoni
Alpine thrush, Zoothera mollissima
Himalayan thrush, Zoothera salimalii
Sichuan thrush, Zoothera griseiceps
Dark-sided thrush, Zoothera marginata
Long-billed thrush, Zoothera monticola
White's thrush, Zoothera aurea
Scaly thrush, Zoothera dauma
Purple cochoa, Cochoa purpurea
Green cochoa, Cochoa viridis
Siberian thrush, Geokichla sibirica
Orange-headed thrush, Geokichla citrina
Chinese thrush, Otocichla mupinensis (A)
Chinese blackbird, Turdus mandarinus
Gray-winged blackbird, Turdus boulboul
Japanese thrush, Turdus cardis
Gray-backed thrush, Turdus hortulorum
Black-breasted thrush, Turdus dissimilis
Eyebrowed thrush, Turdus obscurus
Pale thrush, Turdus pallidus (A)
Chestnut thrush, Turdus rubrocanus
Red-throated thrush, Turdus ruficollis (A)
Dusky thrush, Turdus eunomus

Old World flycatchersOrder: PasseriformesFamily: Muscicapidae

Old World flycatchers are a large group of small passerine birds native to the Old World. They are mainly small arboreal insectivores. The appearance of these birds is highly varied, but they mostly have weak songs and harsh calls.

Gray-streaked flycatcher, Muscicapa griseisticta
Dark-sided flycatcher, Muscicapa sibirica
Ferruginous flycatcher, Muscicapa ferruginea
Asian brown flycatcher, Muscicapa dauurica
Brown-breasted flycatcher, Muscicapa muttui
Brown-streaked flycatcher, Muscicapa williamsoni
Oriental magpie-robin, Copsychus saularis
White-rumped shama, Copsychus malabaricus
White-gorgeted flycatcher, Anthipes monileger
Rufous-browed flycatcher, Anthipes solitaris
White-tailed flycatcher, Cyornis concretus
Hainan blue flycatcher, Cyornis hainanus
Pale blue flycatcher, Cyornis unicolor
Chinese blue flycatcher, Cyornis glaucicomans
Hill blue flycatcher, Cyornis whitei
Indochinese blue flycatcher, Cyornis sumatrensis
Brown-chested jungle-flycatcher, Cyornis brunneatus
Large niltava, Niltava grandis
Small niltava, Niltava macgrigoriae
Fujian niltava, Niltava davidi
Rufous-bellied niltava, Niltava sundara
Vivid niltava, Niltava vivida
Blue-and-white flycatcher, Cyanoptila cyanomelana
Zappey's flycatcher, Cyanoptila cumatilis (A)
Verditer flycatcher, Eumyias thalassina
Gould's shortwing, Brachypteryx stellata
Lesser shortwing, Brachypteryx leucophrys
Himalayan shortwing, Brachypteryx cruralis
Chinese shortwing, Brachypteryx sinensis
Rufous-tailed robin, Larvivora sibilans
Japanese robin, Larvivora akahige (A)
Siberian blue robin, Larvivora cyane
White-bellied redstart, Luscinia phaenicuroides (A)
Bluethroat, Luscinia svecica
Blue whistling-thrush, Myophonus caeruleus
Little forktail, Enicurus scouleri
White-crowned forktail, Enicurus leschenaulti
Spotted forktail, Enicurus maculatus
Slaty-backed forktail, Enicurus schistaceus
Blackthroat, Calliope obscura
Siberian rubythroat, Calliope calliope
White-tailed robin, Myiomela leucura
Blue-fronted robin, Cinclidium frontale
Red-flanked bluetail, Tarsiger cyanurus
Himalayan bluetail, Tarsiger rufilatus
White-browed bush-robin, Tarsiger indicus
Golden bush-robin, Tarsiger chrysaeus
Yellow-rumped flycatcher, Ficedula zanthopygia
Green-backed flycatcher, Ficedula elisae
Narcissus flycatcher, Ficedula narcissina
Mugimaki flycatcher, Ficedula mugimaki
Slaty-backed flycatcher, Ficedula erithacus (A)
Slaty-blue flycatcher, Ficedula tricolor
Snowy-browed flycatcher, Ficedula hyperythra
Pygmy flycatcher, Ficedula hodgsoni
Rufous-gorgeted flycatcher, Ficedula strophiata
Sapphire flycatcher, Ficedula sapphira
Little pied flycatcher, Ficedula westermanni
Taiga flycatcher, Ficedula albicilla
Red-breasted flycatcher, Ficedula parva
Blue-fronted redstart, Phoenicurus frontalis
Plumbeous redstart, Phoenicurus fuliginosus
White-capped redstart, Phoenicurus leucocephalus
Black redstart, Phoenicurus ochruros (A)
Daurian redstart, Phoenicurus auroreus
Chestnut-bellied rock-thrush, Monticola rufiventris
White-throated rock-thrush, Monticola gularis
Blue rock-thrush, Monticola solitarius
Siberian stonechat, Saxicola maurus (A)
Amur stonechat, Saxicola stejnegeri
Pied bushchat, Saxicola caprata
Jerdon's bushchat, Saxicola jerdoni
Gray bushchat, Saxicola ferreus

FlowerpeckersOrder: PasseriformesFamily: Dicaeidae

The flowerpeckers are very small, stout, often brightly coloured birds, with short tails, short thick curved bills and tubular tongues.

Scarlet-breasted flowerpecker, Prionochilus thoracicus
Thick-billed flowerpecker, Dicaeum agile
Yellow-vented flowerpecker, Dicaeum chrysorrheum
Yellow-bellied flowerpecker, Dicaeum melanozanthum
Orange-bellied flowerpecker, Dicaeum trigonostigma (A)
Plain flowerpecker, Dicaeum minullum
Fire-breasted flowerpecker, Dicaeum ignipectus
Scarlet-backed flowerpecker, Dicaeum cruentatum

Sunbirds and spiderhuntersOrder: PasseriformesFamily: Nectariniidae

The sunbirds and spiderhunters are very small passerine birds which feed largely on nectar, although they will also take insects, especially when feeding young. Flight is fast and direct on their short wings. Most species can take nectar by hovering like a hummingbird, but usually perch to feed.

Ruby-cheeked sunbird, Chalcoparia singalensis
Brown-throated sunbird, Anthreptes malacensis
Van Hasselt's sunbird, Leptocoma brasiliana
Copper-throated sunbird, Leptocoma calcostetha
Purple sunbird, Cinnyris asiaticus
Olive-backed sunbird, Cinnyris jugularis
Black-throated sunbird, Aethopyga saturata
Mrs. Gould's sunbird, Aethopyga gouldiae
Green-tailed sunbird, Aethopyga nipalensis
Crimson sunbird, Aethopyga siparaja
Fork-tailed sunbird, Aethopyga christinae
Purple-naped sunbird, Kurochkinegramma hypogrammicum
Little spiderhunter, Arachnothera longirostra
Streaked spiderhunter, Arachnothera magna
Gray-breasted spiderhunter, Arachnothera modesta

Fairy-bluebirdsOrder: PasseriformesFamily: Irenidae

The fairy-bluebirds are bulbul-like birds of open forest or thorn scrub. The males are dark-blue and the females a duller green.

Asian fairy-bluebird, Irena puella

LeafbirdsOrder: PasseriformesFamily: Chloropseidae

The leafbirds are small, bulbul-like birds. The males are brightly plumaged, usually in greens and yellows.

Blue-winged leafbird, Chloropsis cochinchinensis
Golden-fronted leafbird, Chloropsis aurifrons
Orange-bellied leafbird, Chloropsis hardwickii

Weavers and alliesOrder: PasseriformesFamily: Ploceidae

The weavers are small passerine birds related to the finches. They are seed-eating birds with rounded conical bills. The males of many species are brightly coloured, usually in red or yellow and black, some species show variation in colour only in the breeding season.

Streaked weaver, Ploceus manyar
Baya weaver, Ploceus philippinus
Asian golden weaver, Ploceus hypoxanthus

Waxbills and alliesOrder: PasseriformesFamily: Estrildidae

The estrildid finches are small passerine birds of the Old World tropics and Australasia. They are gregarious and often colonial seed eaters with short thick but pointed bills. They are all similar in structure and habits, but have wide variation in plumage colours and patterns.

Red avadavat, Amandava amandava
Pin-tailed parrotfinch, Erythrura prasina
White-rumped munia, Lonchura striata
Scaly-breasted munia, Lonchura punctulata
White-bellied munia, Lonchura leucogastra
Chestnut munia, Lonchura atricapilla
White-headed munia, Lonchura maja
Java sparrow, Padda oryzivora (I)

Old World sparrowsOrder: PasseriformesFamily: Passeridae

Old World sparrows are small passerine birds. In general, sparrows tend to be small, plump, brown or grey birds with short tails and short powerful beaks. Sparrows are seed eaters, but they also consume small insects.

House sparrow, Passer domesticus (I)
Russet sparrow, Passer cinnamomeus
Plain-backed sparrow, Passer flaveolus
Eurasian tree sparrow, Passer montanus

Wagtails and pipitsOrder: PasseriformesFamily: Motacillidae

Motacillidae is a family of small passerine birds with medium to long tails. They include the wagtails, longclaws and pipits. They are slender, ground feeding insectivores of open country.

Forest wagtail, Dendronanthus indicus
Gray wagtail, Motacilla cinerea
Western yellow wagtail, Motacilla flava
Eastern yellow wagtail, Motacilla tschutschensis
Citrine wagtail, Motacilla citreola
Mekong wagtail, Motacilla samveasnae
White wagtail, Motacilla alba
Richard's pipit, Anthus richardi
Paddyfield pipit, Anthus rufulus
Upland pipit, Anthus sylvanus (A)
Rosy pipit, Anthus roseatus
Olive-backed pipit, Anthus hodgsoni
Red-throated pipit, Anthus cervinus
Water pipit, Anthus spinoletta
American pipit, Anthus rubescens (A)

Finches, euphonias, and alliesOrder: PasseriformesFamily: Fringillidae

Finches are seed-eating passerine birds, that are small to moderately large and have a strong beak, usually conical and in some species very large. All have twelve tail feathers and nine primaries. These birds have a bouncing flight with alternating bouts of flapping and gliding on closed wings, and most sing well.

Brambling, Fringilla montifringilla (A)
Spot-winged grosbeak, Mycerobas melanozanthos
Yellow-billed grosbeak, Eophona migratoria (A)
Japanese grosbeak, Eophona personata (A)
Common rosefinch, Carpodacus erythrinus
Scarlet finch, Carpodacus sipahi
Vinaceous rosefinch, Carpodacus vinaceus (A)
Brown bullfinch, Pyrrhula nipalensis
Gray-headed bullfinch, Pyrrhula erythaca (A)
Dark-breasted rosefinch, Procarduelis nipalensis
Oriental greenfinch, Chloris sinica
Vietnamese greenfinch, Chloris monguilloti (E)
Black-headed greenfinch, Chloris ambigua
Red crossbill, Loxia curvirostra
Eurasian siskin, Spinus spinus (A)

Old World buntingsOrder: PasseriformesFamily''': Emberizidae

The emberizids are a large family of passerine birds. They are seed-eating birds with distinctively shaped bills. Many emberizid species have distinctive head patterns.

Crested bunting, Emberiza lathamiBlack-headed bunting, Emberiza melanocephala (A)
Red-headed bunting, Emberiza bruniceps (A)
Chestnut-eared bunting, Emberiza fucataGodlewski's bunting, Emberiza godlewskii (A)
Gray-necked bunting, Emberiza buchanani (A)
Yellow-throated bunting, Emberiza elegans (A)
Pallas's bunting, Emberiza pallasi (A)
Reed bunting, Emberiza schoeniclus (A)
Yellow-breasted bunting, Emberiza aureolaLittle bunting, Emberiza pusillaRustic bunting, Emberiza rustica (A)
Black-faced bunting, Emberiza spodocephalaChestnut bunting, Emberiza rutilaTristram's bunting, Emberiza tristrami''

See also
List of birds
Lists of birds by region

References

External links
Multilingual list of birds of Vietnam - Includes equivalents in English, French, Chinese, Japanese, Thai, Malaysian and Indonesian

Vietnam
Vietnam
 
Birds